Jug Fork is an unincorporated community on the Lee-Union County line in northeast Mississippi.

The Lee County side is part of the Tupelo Micropolitan Statistical Area.

References

Unincorporated communities in Lee County, Mississippi
Unincorporated communities in Union County, Mississippi
Unincorporated communities in Mississippi